Veraval Turk Jamaat is a community in Karachi, Sindh, Pakistan. They are a sub-group of the Turk Jamat of Gujarat. Members of Veraval Turk Jamaat migrated from Veraval, India to Karachi, Pakistan after independence in 1947. Most of the members of this community are settled in Muhajir Camp of Baldia Town.

Members of Veraval Turk Jamaat are Muslims and follow Sunni Hanafi school of Islam. Some members of Veraval Turk Jamaat still live in  Veraval. The Veraval Turk Jamaat claim ancestry from Turk soldiers belonging to the army of Sultan Mahmud Ghaznavi who settled after the conquest of Somnath Temple. Most of the Turk soldiers settled near Somnath Temple in Veraval (a sea port of Junagardh State in Gujarat, India. After Partition in 1947 most of the members of this community migrated to Karachi, Pakistan to save their lives.

In early 1950s they stayed at near Kharadar, Khadda Market, Baghdadi and Nayaabad in Karachi. After permission of the government they moved to Baldia Town No.5 Muhajir Camp and established a complete community structure at Turk Muhalla Baldia No.5. First they build a Mosque and a Market. This Community is a largest community in numbers in Baldia Town, Karachi.

See also 
 Turk Jamat

Muslim communities of Gujarat
Turkish communities outside Turkey
Muhajir communities
Culture of Karachi